Cristian Damián Erbes (born 6 January 1990 in Buenos Aires) is an Argentine footballer who plays for Deportes La Serena as a midfielder.

He made his debut during the 2009/10 season playing for Boca Juniors.

Honours

Boca Juniors
Primera División: 2
 2011 Apertura
 2015 Argentine Primera División

Copa Argentina: 2
 2011–12 Copa Argentina
 2014–15 Copa Argentina

References

External links 

Living people
1990 births
Footballers from Buenos Aires
Argentine footballers
Argentine expatriate footballers
Association football midfielders
Boca Juniors footballers
C.D. Veracruz footballers
Chacarita Juniors footballers
Club Nacional footballers
Atlético Tucumán footballers
Deportes La Serena footballers
Argentine Primera División players
Liga MX players
Ukrainian Premier League players
Paraguayan Primera División players
Chilean Primera División players
Expatriate footballers in Chile
Argentine expatriate sportspeople in Chile
Expatriate footballers in Mexico
Argentine expatriate sportspeople in Mexico
Expatriate footballers in Ukraine
Argentine expatriate sportspeople in Ukraine
Expatriate footballers in Paraguay
Argentine expatriate sportspeople in Paraguay
FC Karpaty Lviv players